Trojak ("threesome", "trio", in Polish) is a Silesian folk dance. It is usually performed in groups of three: one male dancer and two female dancers. Trojak's music has two distinct parts, each having its own tempo and metre.

Ignoring the footwork, the figures may have the following arrangements.

All three move in sync from the same foot.
The boy dances with one girl, the second one dancing alone, then the boy switches the girl.
Girls are rolling on and then rolling off the arms.
The trio forms a circle
The boy and the girls separate and move in the opposite directions, then join again.

References

Polish dances
Belarusian folk dances